This is a list of German football transfers in the 2009–10 winter transfer window by club. Only transfers of the Bundesliga, and 2. Bundesliga are included.

Bundesliga

VfL Wolfsburg

In:

Out:

Note: Flags indicate national team as has been defined under FIFA eligibility rules. Players may hold more than one non-FIFA nationality.

}

FC Bayern Munich

In:

Out:

VfB Stuttgart

In:

Out:

Hertha BSC

In:

Out:

Hamburger SV

In:

Out:

Borussia Dortmund

In:

Out:

TSG 1899 Hoffenheim

In:

Out:

FC Schalke 04

In:

Out:

Bayer 04 Leverkusen

In:

Out:

Werder Bremen

In:

Out:

Hannover 96

In:

Out:

1. FC Köln

In:

Out:

Eintracht Frankfurt

In:

Out:

VfL Bochum

In:

Out:

Borussia Mönchengladbach

In:

Out:

SC Freiburg

In:

Out:

FSV Mainz 05

In:

Out:

1. FC Nürnberg

In:

Out:

2. Bundesliga

FC Energie Cottbus

In:

Out:

Karlsruher SC

In:

Out:

Arminia Bielefeld

In:

Out:

Alemannia Aachen

In:

Out:

SpVgg Greuther Fürth

In:

Out:

MSV Duisburg

In:

Out:

1. FC Kaiserslautern

In:

Out:

FC St. Pauli

In:

Out:

Rot-Weiß Oberhausen

In:

Out:

Rot Weiss Ahlen

In:

Out:

FC Augsburg

In:

Out:

TSV 1860 Munich

In:

Out:

FC Hansa Rostock

In:

Out:

TuS Koblenz

In:

Out:

FSV Frankfurt

In:

Out:

1. FC Union Berlin

In:

Out:

Fortuna Düsseldorf

In:

Out:

SC Paderborn 07

In:

Out:

See also	
 2009–10 Bundesliga
 2009–10 2. Bundesliga
 List of German football transfers summer 2009

References

External links
 Official site of the DFB 
 Kicker.de 
 Official site of the Bundesliga 
 Official site of the Bundesliga

Trans
German
2009-10